H. H. Hollis was a pseudonym of Ben Neal Ramey (7 October 1921 - May 1977), who was an American science fiction short story writer and essayist. Ramey's main career was as a lawyer in Texas; he wrote science fiction as a hobby. Two of his stories, "The Guerrilla Trees" (1968) and "Sword Game" (1968), were each nominated for a Nebula Award.

Bibliography

Short stories

"Ouled Nail" (1966)
"Cybernia", If (July 1966)
"The Long, Slow Orbits" (1967)
"Travelers Guide to Megahouston" (1967)
"The Guerrilla Trees" (1968)
"Sword Game" (1968)
"Eeeetz Ch" (1968)
"Too Many People" (1971)
"Stoned Counsel" (1972)
"Different Angel" (1973)
"Every Day in Every Way" (1976)
"The Widow Figler Versus Ceramic Gardens of Memory, Inc." (1976)
"Arachne" (1976)
"Dark Body" (1976)
"Inertia" (1976)
"Even Money" (1979)

References

Notes

Bibliography

External links
 

American science fiction writers
1921 births
1977 deaths
Novelists from Texas
American male short story writers
20th-century American novelists
American male essayists
American male novelists
20th-century American short story writers
20th-century American essayists
20th-century American male writers
Texas lawyers